, son of Konoe Iehiro and adopted son of Fusahiro, was a kuge or Japanese court noble of the Edo period (1603–1868). He died at age 8 of illness after inheriting the Takatsukasa family at age 5. His wife and he did not have a son.

Family 
Parents
Biological Father: Takatsukasa Fusahiro (鷹司 房熙, September 6, 1710 – June 9, 1730),
Father: Konoe Iehiro (近衛 家熈[1], July 24, 1667 – November 5, 1736)
Mother: Unkwon concubine
Consorts and issues:
Wife: Unknown

References
 

1726 births
1733 deaths
Fujiwara clan
Takatsukasa family